The Loire's tributaries include the following rivers, in order going upstream:

 Acheneau

 Boulogne

 Sèvre Nantaise (in Nantes)
 Erdre (in Nantes)
 Èvre (in Le Marillais)
 Layon (in Chalonnes-sur-Loire)
 Maine (near Angers)
 Mayenne (near Angers)
 Oudon (in Le Lion-d'Angers)
 Verzée (in Segré)
 Ernée (in Saint-Jean-sur-Mayenne)
 Sarthe (near Angers)
 Loir (north of Angers)
 Braye (in Pont-de-Braye)
 Aigre (near Cloyes-sur-le-Loir)
 Yerre (near Cloyes-sur-le-Loir)
 Conie (near Châteaudun)
 Ozanne (in Bonneval)
 Vaige (in Sablé-sur-Sarthe)
 Vègre (in Avoise)
 Huisne (in Le Mans)
 Authion (in Sainte-Gemmes-sur-Loire)
 Thouet (near Saumur)
 Dive (near Saint-Just-sur-Dive)
 Losse (near Montreuil-Bellay)
 Argenton (near Saint-Martin-de-Sanzay)
 Thouaret (near Taizé)
 Cébron (near Saint-Loup-sur-Thouet)
 Palais (near Parthenay)
 Viette (near Parthenay)
 Vienne (in Candes-Saint-Martin)
 Creuse (north of Châtellerault)
 Gartempe (in La Roche-Posay)
 Anglin (in Angles-sur-l'Anglin)
 Salleron (in Ingrandes)
 Benaize (in Saint-Hilaire-sur-Benaize)
 Abloux (in Prissac)
 Brame (in Darnac)
 Semme (in Droux)
 Petite Creuse (in Fresselines)
 Clain (in Châtellerault)
 Clouère (in Château-Larcher)
 Briance (in Condat-sur-Vienne)
 Taurion (in Saint-Priest-Taurion)
 Indre (east of Candes-Saint-Martin)
 Indrois (in Azay-sur-Indre)
 Cher (in Villandry)
 Sauldre (in Selles-sur-Cher)
 Rère (in Villeherviers)
 Arnon (near Vierzon)
 Yèvre (in Vierzon)
 Auron (in Bourges)
 Airain (in Savigny-en-Septaine)
 Tardes (in Évaux-les-Bains)
 Voueize (in Chambon-sur-Voueize)
 Beuvron (in Chaumont-sur-Loire)
 Cosson (in Candé-sur-Beuvron)
 Loiret (in Orléans)
 Vauvise (in Saint-Satur)

 Allier (near Nevers)
 Sioule (in La Ferté-Hauterive)
 Bouble (in Saint-Pourçain-sur-Sioule)
 Dore (near Puy-Guillaume)
 Alagnon (near Jumeaux)
 Senouire (near Brioude)
 Ance (in Monistrol-d'Allier)
 Chapeauroux (in Saint-Christophe-d'Allier)
 Nièvre (in Nevers)
 Acolin (near Decize)
 Aron (in Decize)
 Alène (in Cercy-la-Tour)
 Besbre (near Dompierre-sur-Besbre)
 Arroux (in Digoin)
 Bourbince (in Digoin)
 Arconce (in Varenne-Saint-Germain)
 Lignon du Forez (in Feurs)
 Furan (in Andrézieux-Bouthéon)
 Ondaine (in Unieux)
 Lignon du Velay (in Monistrol-sur-Loire)

 
Loire